The men's hammer throw was a track and field athletics event held as part of the athletics at the 1912 Summer Olympics programme. It was the fourth appearance of the event, which had been won all three previous times by John Flanagan. The competition was held on Sunday, July 14, 1912. Fourteen hammer throwers from four nations competed. NOCs could enter up to 12 athletes. The event was won by Matt McGrath of the United States, the nation's fourth consecutive victory in the event. McGrath was the second man (after Flanagan) to earn multiple medals in the hammer throw. Duncan Gillis of Canada took silver. Clarence Childs of the United States finished third for bronze.

Background

This was the fourth appearance of the event, which has been held at every Summer Olympics except 1896. In the absence of retired three-time champion American John Flanagan, the heavy favorite was another American: Matt McGrath, who had given Flanagan a strong challenge in 1908 and had replaced him as the top hammer thrower since the London Games. 

American John Flanagan was the two-time defending Olympic champion, was a seven-time AAU champion, and had also won national titles in Great Britain and Ireland; he was the favorite. Fellow American Matt McGrath was rising as a challenger, however, and had taken second place in the 1907 AAU championship. McGrath was struggling with a knee injury but still hoped to supplant the 40-year-old Flanagan as the premier hammer thrower of the day.

For the second time (after 1904), no nations made their debut in the event. The United States appeared for the fourth time, the only nation to have competed at each appearance of the event to that point.

Competition format

The competition continued to use the divided-final format used in 1908, with results carrying over between the two "rounds". Each athlete received three throws in the qualifying round. The top three men advanced to the final, where they received an additional three throws. The best result, qualifying or final, counted.

Records

These were the standing world and Olympic records (in metres) prior to the 1912 Summer Olympics.

* unofficial

Matt McGrath set a new Olympic record in the qualification with 54.13 metres and improved his record in the final with 54.74 metres.

Schedule

Results

Flanagan, who had won all three prior editions of the Olympic hammer throw and held the Olympic record of 51.92 metres, had retired since the 1908 Olympic Games. McGrath took the gold medal, besting Flanagan's Olympic record with all four of his legal marks. No other thrower beat Flanagan's Olympic mark. McGrath's worst legal throw was 4.44 metres longer than anyone else's best.

References

Sources
 
 

Athletics at the 1912 Summer Olympics
Hammer throw at the Olympics